The Tigre Club stands on the banks of the Luján River, in Paseo Victorica, Tigre, near Buenos Aires, Argentina. The club, built next to the Tigre Hotel (demolished in 1940), was financed by Ernesto Tornquist and was designed by the architects Pablo Pater, Luis Dubois and the engineer Emilio Mitre (son of the former President of Argentina, Bartolomé Mitre); it was opened on 13 January 1912. Like the hotel nearby opened in 1890, the Tigre Club soon became an important meeting place for the rich and famous. The elegant and luxurious building has two floors with mezzanines with large windows on almost all sides. The main saloon on the first floor has frescoes by the Spanish artist Julio Vila y Prades (1875-1930), the staircases are of marble and there are Venetian mirrors and French chandeliers.

A casino operated there from 1927 until 1933, when it was transferred to Mar del Plata after a law was passed prohibiting the existence of a casino so close to Buenos Aires. The closing of the casino and the international crisis brought about a considerable loss of visitors. After the demolition of the Tigre Hotel in 1940, the club continued to function as a restaurant with live shows but it never recovered its former glory.

In 1979 the Tigre Club was declared a National Historic Monument. After extensive restoration it now houses the Tigre Municipal Museum of Fine Art (Museo de Arte Tigre), opened in 2006. The museum houses an extensive collection of Argentine art.

References 

Official site

External links

Catalogue of Monuments
Museo de Arte Tigre 

National Historic Monuments of Argentina
Art museums and galleries in Argentina
Commercial buildings completed in 1912
Museums established in 2006
Tigre, Buenos Aires
1912 establishments in Argentina